Tamás Burkus (14 November 1972 – 11 May 1999) was a Hungarian sports shooter. He competed in the men's 10 metre running target event at the 1996 Summer Olympics.

References

1972 births
1999 deaths
Hungarian male sport shooters
Olympic shooters of Hungary
Shooters at the 1996 Summer Olympics
Sport shooters from Budapest